Maria Eugenia Cotera (born July 17, 1964) is an American author, researcher, and professor. Maria Cotera is an associate professor at the University of Texas. She started as a researcher and writer at the  Chicana Research and Learning Center. In 1989 she helped produce "Crystal City: A Twenty Year Reflection," a documentary about young women in the 1969 Chicano student walkout in Crystal City, Texas.

Early life 
Maria Cotera was born in Austin, Texas on July 17, 1964, to Chicana activist Martha P. Cotera (born 1938) and United States Air Force veteran and urban renewal architect student Juan Cotera. Juan and Martha Cotera married in 1963 and was one of equals. Martha's mother initially felt guilty after having Maria for bringing in a child, especially a daughter into the world given its current state; this inspired her to make a difference in society.

Maria had a brother, Juan Javier who passed away at the age of 25.

Cotera's mother, Martha P. Cotera is a Mexican-born American activist. Maria was a good student at a young age, as she learned English quickly and skipped two grades. She has been a strong believer in feminism and equal rights, and has taught her daughter to believe in it as well. She is a longtime advocate for women's rights and has helped transform the gendered politics of the Chicano Movement.

Cotera's father did his undergraduate studies at Texas Western College, his Bachelor of Architecture degree and his Graduate Studies in Urban and Regional Planning at the University of Texas. In 2003 he helped found COTERA+REED ARCHITECTS with Philip Reed.

Career 
Cotera's first book, Native Speakers: Ella Deloria, Zora Neale Hurston, Jovita Gonzalez and the Poetics of Culture, received the Gloria Anzaldua book prize for 2009 from the  Women's Studies Association (NWSA). This prize is awarded for "groundbreaking scholarship in women's studies that makes significant contributions to women of color/transnational scholarship."

Bibliography 
 Native Speakers: Ella Cara Deloria, Zora Neale Hurston, Jovita González and the Poetics of Culture, 2008, University of Texas Press, ISBN 978-0292721616

References

Sources
 
 

Living people
1964 births
Chicana feminists
People from Ypsilanti, Michigan
Writers from Austin, Texas
Stanford University alumni
American writers of Mexican descent
American feminists
People from Mercedes, Texas
University of Michigan faculty